Per Spook (born 2 July 1939) is a Norwegian fashion designer.  He was awarded Aiguille d'Or (The Golden Needle) in 1978, and Dé d'Or (The Golden Thimble) in 1993. He was decorated Knight, First Class of the Royal Norwegian Order of St. Olav in 2003.

After studying fashion at the Norwegian School of Arts, Crafts and Design in Oslo, where he graduated, Per Spook arrived in Paris at the age of 20, where he entered the Chambre Syndicale de la Mode school. He then worked as a freelance designer for several fashion houses, such as Christian Dior and Saint-Laurent, before joining Louis Féraud.

In 1977 he opened his own fashion house in Paris and the following year he received the Golden Needle for the most creative collection for autumn/winter 1978-1979. He also received the Gullfingerbølet for this collection. In 1995 he closed the fashion house in Paris.

He then worked in Japan, where he designed and created ready-to-wear clothing under his own name in Japan every year.

Spook is known for his love of black and white. His exhibitions are often marked by themes such as graphic patterns and inspiration from Nordic nature and climate. In 2003 he was awarded the Order of St. Olav. He received the Norwegian fashion industry's honorary in 2005.

He published a first book entitled "Per Spook, Haute couture 1977-1995" in which he photographed his 18 years of designs himself. In this way, he takes a look at his fashion and his carefully preserved clothes, giving them a soul.

References

1939 births
Living people
Businesspeople from Oslo
Norwegian fashion designers